Sunday 'Kada is a Philippine sketch comedy variety show broadcast on TV5. The show premiered on October 18, 2020 in the 3 p.m. timeslot following its companion program I Got You as part of the network's Sunday afternoon programming block. Sunday 'Kada serves as a successor to the defunct ABS-CBN gag show Banana Sundae, featuring much of its former cast, including Jayson Gainza, Ritz Azul (a returning Kapatid talent), Wacky Kiray, and many others. On June 13, 2021, the pilot episode of the show became available on Brightlight Productions' programming affiliate ABS-CBN's iWantTFC and worldwide via The Filipino Channel.

The program is produced by Brightlight Productions of former Rep. Albee Benitez in cooperation with Cignal TV, the programming affiliate of TV5.  The show is directed by renowned comedy director Edgar Mortiz.

After five months on air, Brightlight Productions announced on March 27, 2021 that this show will take a hiatus, and Sunday Noontime Live! will end on March 28, 2021 as producer claims that both shows does not earning profit as well as poor ratings and loss of advertisers' support.

On June 13, 2021, the pilot episode of the show became available on ABS-CBN's iWantTFC and worldwide via The Filipino Channel.

Cast
 Jayson Gainza
 Ritz Azul
 Joshua Colet
 Sunshine Garcia
 Wacky Kiray
 Daniel Matsunaga
 Maxine Medina
 Miles Ocampo
 Jerome Ponce
 Badjie Mortiz
 Chienna Filomeno
 Maika Rivera

See also
 Banana Sundae
 iWantTFC
 List of programs aired by TV5 (Philippine TV network)
 Kapatid Channel

References

External links

2020 Philippine television series debuts
2021 Philippine television series endings
2020s Philippine television series
Philippine comedy television series
Philippine television sketch shows
TV5 (Philippine TV network) original programming
Television series by Brightlight Productions
Filipino-language television shows